Anthony Osei Boakye (born 15 October 1949) is a Ghanaian politician and a member of the Sixth Parliament of the Fourth Republic of Ghana representing Atwima Nwabiagya South in the Ashanti Region of Ghana.

Personal life and education 
Boakye was born on 15 October 1949 in a town known as Toase in his region. He earned his Bachelor of Science degree in education from University of Cape Coast in 1977.

He was the immediate past managing director of Produce Buying Company Limited.

He is a Christian and is married with three children, and seven grandchildren.

Political career 
Boakye was elected into the sixth parliament of the fourth republic of Ghana on 7 January 2013 after the completion of the 2012 Ghanaian general election, where he obtained 74.29% of the valid votes cast. He served until 6 January 2017.

References 

University of Cape Coast alumni
1949 births
Living people
Ghanaian MPs 2013–2017
New Patriotic Party politicians